Marcus Henry can refer to:

Marcus Henry (offensive lineman) (born 1993), American football center
Marcus Henry (wide receiver) (born 1986), American former wide receiver